Kokko may refer to:

 Kokko (surname)
 Kokko, Kale, Burma

See also 
 Kokko, a bonfire especially in Midsummer Eve celebrations in Finland
 Kokkola, a town and municipality of Finland